Evona is an unincorporated community in Gentry County, in the U.S. state of Missouri.

History
Evona was platted in 1879. The name Evona was coined by the railroad. A post office was established at Evona in 1880, and remained in operation until 1935.

References

Unincorporated communities in Gentry County, Missouri
Unincorporated communities in Missouri